Nightlife is the seventh studio album by English synth-pop duo Pet Shop Boys, released on 8 October 1999 by Parlophone. After the release and promotion of their previous album, Bilingual (1996), Pet Shop Boys started work with playwright Jonathan Harvey on the stage musical that eventually became Closer to Heaven (at one stage during the writing process, the musical was given the name of Nightlife). Pet Shop Boys soon had an album's worth of tracks and decided to release the album Nightlife as a concept album and in order to showcase some of the songs that would eventually make it into the musical.

The album incorporates a variety of musical influences, including hard trance on the Rollo-produced "For Your Own Good" and "Radiophonic"; dance-pop on "Closer to Heaven" and "I Don't Know What You Want but I Can't Give It Any More"; disco pastiche on "New York City Boy"; and country music on "You Only Tell Me You Love Me When You're Drunk". The track "Happiness Is an Option" is based on Sergei Rachmaninoff's classical piece Vocalise, Op. 34, No. 14.

As of May 2001, the album had sold 1.2 million copies worldwide. It reached number seven on the UK Albums Chart (their first studio album not to reach the top five) and spent three weeks on the chart at the time, but re-entered at number 29 in 2017 following the album's Further Listening 1996–2000 reissue. It also became the duo's lowest-charting studio album in the United States, reaching number 84 on the Billboard 200.

"In Denial" with Kylie Minogue
"In Denial" is a duet featuring Kylie Minogue. It was seen as a risk by critics  because this project came at a time when Minogue was experiencing low record sales and did not have her own record contract. Pet Shop Boys had previously written a song titled "Falling" for Minogue's 1994 album Kylie Minogue. The same year as Nightlife'''s release, Minogue also signed to Parlophone and released her hugely successful Light Years album in 2000. Minogue would later sing "In Denial" on her Showgirl: The Greatest Hits Tour, with Neil Tennant's pre-recorded vocals being played as part of the duet while Minogue sang live.

Visuals
For the promotion of the album, the band adopted a stark new appearance, designed in consultation with theatre designer Ian McNeil. Now, the duo ubiquitously appeared wearing thick, dark eyebrows, inspired by Kabuki theatre; yellow or orange wigs in a variety of hairstyles, inspired by the punk subculture (especially several spiked wigs); and black sunglasses. This was supported by a series of outfits in dark, muted colours, the most deviant of which incorporated culottes, inspired by the attire of samurai, instead of trousers. Photographs involving the costumes were often set in urban environments; the Midland Grand Hotel in Kings Cross, London was used as the setting to debut the look. The costumes were used for promotional photographs, the album cover and liner notes, all the single covers, as well as the Nightlife Tour.

The music video for "I Don't Know What You Want But I Can't Give It Anymore" showed Tennant and Lowe being transformed into their new appearances, though in a fantastical manner: they are operated on by medical laboratory machines, then covered in talcum powder and dressed by monks in a ritual-like manner. Finally, they are given dogs on leashes and released into a "different world", where everyone else is also dressed in exactly the same way. Conceptualised among the band members, McNeil, and director Pedro Romhanyi, the video was created to showcase the costumes. It was visually influenced by the films THX 1138 (1971) in the initial transformation sequence (copying many of its shots and props precisely); Ridicule (1996), in the ritualistic dressing-up scene; 2001: A Space Odyssey (1968), in the decor of the living room with an illuminated floor; and A Clockwork Orange (1971), in the outdoor urban setting.

According to Tennant, the costumes helped him to distance himself from the songs, adding to the impersonal nature of Nightlife. In other interviews, he explained that they played into his belief in the need for pop stars to have "bigger than life" public images, and were a reaction against the "naturalistic" look of the 1990s.

Effort was also spent on designing the tour's visuals, with sets designed by deconstructivist architect Zaha Hadid. The stage was modular, and could fit in differently-sized venues and be rearranged by the backing singers throughout each concert.

Track listing

US limited edition bonus CD
A limited-edition two-CD set of Nightlife was released in the United States. The bonus disc, titled Nightlife Extra, contained all the B-sides from the UK releases of the "I Don't Know What You Want but I Can't Give It Any More" and "New York City Boy" singles, as well as remixes of these singles, some of which were only available in the US on promotional releases.

Further Listening 1996–2000

Personnel
Credits adapted from the liner notes of Nightlife''.

 Pet Shop Boys – arrangement

Additional musicians

 Pete Gleadall – programming ; additional programming 
 Mark Bates – additional keyboards 
 Pauline Taylor – additional vocals 
 Craig Armstrong – arrangement, orchestration ; additional keyboards ; piano ; vocoder ; choir arrangement ; additional piano 
 Stephen Hilton – programming, additional keyboards 
 Richard T. Norris – programming, additional keyboards 
 Pete Lockett – percussion 
 Ali MacLeod – guitar 
 Peter "Ski" Schwartz – additional keyboards ; keyboards, programming, string arrangements 
 Audrey Wheeler – additional vocals 
 Sylvia Mason-James – additional vocals 
 Kate St John – oboe 
 B. J. Cole – pedal steel guitar 
 Scott J. Fraser – bass guitar 
 JB Henry – additional vocals 
 Tessa Niles – additional vocals 
 Carol Kenyon – additional vocals 
 Malcom Hyde-Smith – percussion 
 Paul Herman – guitar 
 Andy Gangadeen – drums 
 Kylie Minogue – vocals 
 Joey Mosk – keyboard programming 
 Vincent Montana Jr. – string arrangements, horn arrangements, string conducting, horn conducting 
 Gene Perez – bass guitar 
 Carlos Gomez – percussion 
 Danny Madden – backing vocals arrangement, backing vocals conducting 
 Steve Abrams – backing vocals 
 Billy Cliff – backing vocals 
 Keith Fluitt – backing vocals 
 John James – backing vocals 
 The London Session Orchestra – orchestra 
 Gavyn Wright – orchestra leader 
 Metro Voices – choir 
 Jenny O'Grady – choir master 
 Matt Dunkley – choir conducting

Technical

 Rollo – production, mixing 
 Pet Shop Boys – production ; mixing 
 Goetz – engineering ; mixing 
 Craig Armstrong – production 
 Andy Bradfield – engineering 
 Mark "Spike" Stent – mixing 
 Geoff Foster – strings recording 
 David Morales – production 
 Steven Barkan – engineering 
 Bill Importico Jr. – engineering assistance 
 Hugo Dwyer – strings engineering 
 Richard Lowe – engineering 
 Jon Smelz – string and horn engineering 
 Tim Young – mastering

Artwork
 Alexei Hay – cover photography
 Eric Watson – inside photography
 Farrow Design – design
 Pet Shop Boys – design

Charts

Weekly charts

Year-end charts

Certifications and sales

Release history

Notes

References

1999 albums
Concept albums
Parlophone albums
Pet Shop Boys albums
Sire Records albums